The following is a list of the 195 communes of the Haute-Vienne department of France.

The communes cooperate in the following intercommunalities (as of 2020):
Communauté urbaine Limoges Métropole
Communauté de communes Briance-Combade
Communauté de communes Briance Sud Haute-Vienne
Communauté de communes Élan Limousin Avenir Nature
Communauté de communes Gartempe Saint-Pardoux
Communauté de communes Haut-Limousin en Marche
Communauté de communes de Noblat
Communauté de communes Ouest Limousin
Communauté de communes Pays de Nexon-Monts de Châlus
Communauté de communes du Pays de Saint-Yrieix (partly)
Communauté de communes Porte Océane du Limousin
Communauté de communes des Portes de Vassivière
Communauté de communes du Val de Vienne

References

Haute-Vienne